General Joseph Yorke, 1st Baron Dover KB, PC (24 June 1724 – 2 December 1792), styled The Honourable Joseph Yorke until 1761 and The Honourable Sir Joseph Yorke between 1761 and 1788, was a British soldier, diplomat and Whig politician.

Background

Yorke was the third son of Philip Yorke, 1st Earl of Hardwicke, by Margaret, daughter of Charles Cocks. Philip Yorke, 2nd Earl of Hardwicke, Charles Yorke and James Yorke were his brothers.

Career
Yorke was commissioned an ensign in the 2nd Regiment of Foot Guards on 25 April 1741, and was promoted to lieutenant in the 1st Regiment of Foot Guards on 24 April 1743. Yorke served in the War of the Austrian Succession as an aide-de-camp to the Duke of Cumberland, and fought in the Battle of Fontenoy on 11 May 1745. On 27 May, he became captain and lieutenant-colonel, commanding a company in the 2nd Guards. On 1 November 1749, he was appointed an aide-de-camp to the King, and on 18 March 1755, colonel of the 9th Regiment of Foot. He became a Major-General in 1758, a Lieutenant-General in 1760 and a full General in 1777.

In 1749 he was appointed Secretary to the British Embassy in Paris. Two years later he became Minister Plenipotentiary to the United Provinces, a post he held for the next thirty years. He was involved in the Anglo-Prussian Convention in 1758. His post was upgraded to that of ambassador in 1761. During this period he also sat in the House of Commons for East Grinstead between 1751 and 1761, for Dover between 1761 and 1774 and for Grampound between 1774 and 1780. He was appointed a Knight Companion of the Order of the Bath (KB) in 1761 and sworn of the Privy Council in 1768. In 1788 he was raised to the peerage as Lord Dover, Baron of the Town and Port of Dover, in the County of Kent.

Family

Lord Dover married  Christiana Charlotte Margaret, daughter of Johan Henrik, Baron de Stöcken, a Danish nobleman, in 1783. They had no children. He died in December 1792, aged 68, when the barony became extinct. Lady Dover only survived her husband by three months and died in March 1793.

References

External links

1724 births
1792 deaths
11th Hussars officers
Barons in the Peerage of Great Britain
Peers of Great Britain created by George III
British Army generals
British Life Guards officers
Yorke, Joseph
Yorke, Joseph
Yorke, Joseph
Yorke, Joseph
Yorke, Joseph
Knights Companion of the Order of the Bath
Members of the Parliament of Great Britain for Dover
Members of the Privy Council of Great Britain
Yorke, Joseph
Yorke, Joseph
Joseph
Ambassadors of Great Britain to the Netherlands
People educated at Newcome's School
Royal Norfolk Regiment officers
8th King's Royal Irish Hussars officers
5th Royal Irish Lancers officers
Members of the Parliament of Great Britain for Grampound
Coldstream Guards officers
Grenadier Guards officers
British Army personnel of the War of the Austrian Succession